Becky Clarke is the name of the following fictional characters:

Becky Clarke, a character in Taken
Becky Clarke (Doctors), a character in Doctors

See also
 Rebecca Clarke (disambiguation)